Prince Anwar Shah Road is a busy road of South Kolkata. It is named after Prince Gulam Mohammed Anwar Ali Shah, one of Tipu Sultan's 12 sons.

Localities

In the aftermath of the death of Tipu Sultan, during the battle of Mysore, the then British rulers threw all twelve sons of Tipu into prison at Vellore. Suspecting that they had powered an abortive rebellion in Vellore jail they were moved to another prison in Calcutta in 1807.

The road starts from the Raja SC Mullick Road where the Jadavpur Police Station is located and is connected to Tollygunge on the west. It first runs to the left of South Kolkata neighbourhood Jodhpur Park before running through Lake Gardens and finally reaching Tollygunge. The South City Mall on Prince Anwar Shah Road, Calcutta’s first "destination mall",  opened its shop floor in early July 2007.

The South City mini-township is located on a  site on Prince Anwar Shah Road in the heart of South Kolkata, just opposite Jodhpur Park. It is minutes away from top city clubs like RCGC and Tollygunge Club, hospitals such as AMRI and EEDF and a stone’s throw from the Metro stations at Tollygunge and Rabindra Sarobar and the connector to EM Bypass and Lake Gardens Rail Overbridge.

The much-awaited Prince Anwar Shah Road connector (Kalikapur Road) to the Eastern Metropolitan Bypass was opened to the public on 1 March, 2007. Prince Anwar Shah Road is connected to Kalikapur Road with Jibanananda Setu (Selimpur Rail Overbridge).

The two-lane road is a shorter alternative to the Rashbehari Avenue connector for motorists approaching the EM Bypass from the southern part of the city. This has improved access to the EM Bypass for the residents of Shahidnagar, Viveknagar, Selimpur etc. Officials of the KMDA claim that it takes less than six minutes to reach the Bypass from the crossing of Prince Anwar Shah Road and Raja SC Mullick Road, which is a continuation of Gariahat Road.

Landmarks

Starting from Tollygunge and moving towards Jadavpur PS Crossing, the following landmarks are visible on Prince Anwar Shah Road.

 South City Mini Township and South City Mall
 City High Apartments
 Sriram Balaji Mandir
 Navina Cinema Hall
 Jogesh Chandra Chaudhuri College
 Merlin Oxford & Merlin Cambridge Towers
 SIRPA Complex
 EEDF Hospital
 MECON Tower
 Jadavpur Police Station
From Jadavpur PS Crossing, on Gariahat Road (S), till the Eastern Metropolitan Bypass is
 Eastern Metropolitan Bypass Connector
 Dhaka Kalibari

Restaurants

South City Mall
 Mainland China
 KFC
 Pizza Hut
 Subway
 Cafe Coffee Day
 Coffee World
 Gelato Italiano

See also

References

External links
 People and buildings on Prince Anwar Shah Road

Roads in Kolkata